Wallingford Center is a census-designated place (CDP) comprising the primary community in the town of Wallingford, New Haven County, Connecticut, United States. It is in the central and southern parts of the town, bordered to the west by the Wilbur Cross Parkway, to the east by Interstate 91, and to the south by the town of North Haven. To the north the CDP extends (from east to west) to New Rock Hill Road, Durham Road, Christian Street, North Elm Street, Maplewood Avenue, and up North Main Street as far as Yale Avenue, where it crosses the Wilbur Cross Parkway. U.S. Route 5 (Colony Street) is the main north–south road through the community. To the north is the neighborhood of Yalesville.

As of the 2010 census, the Wallingford Center CDP had a population of 18,209, out of 45,135 in the entire town of Wallingford.

References 

Census-designated places in New Haven County, Connecticut
Census-designated places in Connecticut